The LG Vu series is a line of high-end stylus enabled Android devices produced by LG Electronics. The "Vu" designation was first introduced in 2008 as a branch of the LG Optimus series for flagship stylus enabled devices, but after the unveiling of the LG Vu 3 in September 2013 (which did not carry the Optimus branding), LG officially introduced the Vu series as a distinct brand separate from Optimus.

Smartphones 
 LG Optimus Vu
 LG Optimus Vu II
 LG Vu 3

References 

LG Electronics mobile phones
Android (operating system) devices